The Dorothy Livesay Poetry Prize, established in 1986, is awarded annually to the best collection of poetry by a resident of British Columbia, Canada.

One of the BC and Yukon Book Prizes, the award was originally known as the B.C. Prize for Poetry. In 1989, it was renamed after poet Dorothy Livesay, whose Day and Night (1944) and Poems for People (1947) received the Governor General's Award for Poetry

Winners and nominees

See also
Canadian poetry
List of poetry awards
List of years in poetry
List of years in literature

References

External links
Dorothy Livesay Poetry Prize, official website
 BC Book Prizes Web site

BC and Yukon Book Prizes
Awards established in 1986
1986 establishments in British Columbia
Canadian poetry awards